The Rabi Council of Leaders and Elders was the municipal body administering Rabi Island in Fiji. Established by the Banaban Settlement Act 1970, the council was dissolved by Fiji's military regime in June 2013. On 23 January 2023, Fijian Prime Minister Sitiveni Rabuka announced that the council would be reestablished.

History
The 8-member Council had two representatives from each of Rabi's four villages. The Council chose a Chairman, and also selected one of its own members to represent the community in the Kiribati House of Assembly (the Rabi Islanders, though Fijian citizens, still carry Kiribati passports and retain official ownership of Banaba Island, whence they or their ancestors came). The Council has its main office in the Fijian capital, Suva.

It was announced in January 2006 that the Rabi Council would be merged with that of Kioa. Misieli Naivalu, the Commissioner for Fiji's Northern Division said on 23 January that Cabinet had decided on 15 January that both islands would benefit from the merger of their councils.

The last election to the council was held in April 2009. It was dissolved by decree of Fiji's military government in June 2013. Following the dissolution, the Fijian government withheld development funding from the island.

References

Cakaudrove Province
Politics of Fiji
Political organisations based in Fiji
Government of Fiji
Banaba